Marie Røpke (born 19 June 1987) is a Danish badminton player.

Personal life
Her mother Lene Køppen won women's singles at the first official World Badminton Championships in 1977 and is a member of the World Badminton Hall of Fame.

Achievements

European Championships
Women's doubles

BWF Grand Prix 
The BWF Grand Prix has two levels, the BWF Grand Prix and Grand Prix Gold. It is a series of badminton tournaments sanctioned by the Badminton World Federation (BWF) since 2007.

Women's doubles

 BWF Grand Prix Gold tournament
 BWF Grand Prix tournament

BWF International Challenge/Series
Women's doubles

Mixed doubles

 BWF International Challenge tournament
 BWF International Series tournament
 BWF Future Series tournament

References

External links
 
 

1987 births
Living people
Danish female badminton players
Sportspeople from Copenhagen
21st-century Danish women